Misfits is an album by the American singer-songwriter Sara Hickman, released in 1997. It was produced in part by Paul Fox.

Critical reception
The Washington Post called Hickman's original songs "alternately haunting and charming."

Track listing 
"Cesar Stasney Introduction" – 0:44
"Strong Woman" (Goldenberg, Hickman) – 3:58
"Dump Truck" (Etzioni, Hickman) – 4:16
"Secrets of Love II" (Hickman, McLemore) – 3:19
"Baby, It's Cold Outside" (Loesser) – 2:48
"Everyone's Gone to the Moon" (King) – 3:43
"Nobody Goes to the Moon Anymore" (Bramblett) – 2:55
"Satin Sheet for Alice" (Hickman) – 3:11
"Rosie's Theme" (Hickman) – 1:00
"Let Me Take Your Picture" (Hickman) – 3:23
"Hey! Where You Goin'?" (Hickman) – 4:07
"Grandma's Feather Bed" (Connor) – 0:29
"False Pretenses" (Boyd) – 2:47
"I Want to Go Swimming in Your Eyes" (Hickman) – 2:24
"Zip-A-Dee-Doo-Dah" (Gilbert, Wrubel) – 3:12
"I Think I Love You" (Romeo) – 4:09
"Take Me With You" (Batteau, Hickman) – 4:11
"Romania" (Hickman) – 5:53
"Like a Collar on a Dog" (Hickman) – 4:52
"Radiation Man" (Hickman) – 5:28

Personnel 
Sara Hickman – acoustic guitar, banjo, guitar, vocals, background vocals
Sandy Abernethy – background vocals, whistling
Josh Alan – electric guitar
Paul Averitt – background vocals
Kevin Axt – upright bass
Scott Babcock – drums
Colin Boyd – background vocals
Brave Combo – performer
Steve Brown – bass guitar
Jim Cocke – keyboards
Kim Corbet – background vocals
Mike Daane – bass guitar
Robert Emery – background vocals
Paul Fox – background vocals
Glenn Fukinaga – bass guitar
Jay Gillian – background vocals
David Grissom – electric guitar
Brian Hartig – drums
Richard Hunter – background vocals
Jackopierce – background vocals
Freddie Jones – background vocals
Tony Levin – bass guitar
Robin Macy – background vocals
Mitch Marine – background vocals
Kris McKay – background vocals
Davis McLarty – drums
Brad McLemore – guitar
Sam Paulos – background vocals
Drew Phelps – bass guitar
Reggie Rueffer – fiddle
David Sancious – piano, background vocals
Chris Searles – percussion
Amy Seltzer – background vocals
Terry Slemmons – background vocals
Larry Spencer – horn, background vocals
Alma Squillante – background vocals
Paul Sweeney – mandolin
Debbie Talasek – background vocals
Craig "Niteman" Taylor – background vocals
James "Son" Thomas – background vocals
Paul Williams – background vocals

Production 
Producers: Sara Hickman, Angelo Badalamenti, Marvin Etzioni, Paul Fox
Executive producer: Sara Hickman
Engineers: Marty Lester, Kevin Smith, Terry Slemmons, Ed Thacker
Arranger: Sara Hickman
Drum programming: Sara Hickman
Mixing: Marty Lester
Mastering: Jerry Tubb

References

Sara Hickman albums
1997 albums